Yevgeni Andreyev may refer to:

 Yevgeni Nikolayevich Andreyev (1926–2000), Air Force Colonel, parachute tester, Hero of the Soviet Union (1962).
 Yevgeni Andreyev (volleyball), Kazakhstani volleyball player who participated in the 2006 FIVB Men's World Championship
 Yevgeni Stepanovich Andreyev (born 1988), Russian footballer